John Cruger Jr. (July 18, 1710 – December 27, 1791) was the speaker of the Province of New York assembly and the 41st Mayor of New York City.

He was born July 18, 1710, the son of John Cruger and Maria Cuyler.  He was a New York City merchant.  He served as the 41st Mayor of New York City from 1757 to 1766. He was a member of New York's delegation to the Stamp Act Congress and a member of the Committee of Correspondence.

He was the speaker of the Province of New York assembly from 1769 to 1775.  In the New York assembly, he voted against approval of the proceedings of the First Continental Congress. He was named as one of the "suspected" persons on the New York Provincial Congress in 1776.

Before the British occupation of New York City, he retired to Kinderhook.  He returned to New York City in 1783 and died December 27, 1791.

References

External links 

 

1710 births
1791 deaths
Mayors of New York City
Members of the New York Provincial Assembly
American people of Danish descent
People of the Province of New York
Colonial American merchants
Speakers of the New York General Assembly
Members of the New York General Assembly
18th-century American politicians